Maronite Catholic Eparchy of Joubbé, Sarba and Jounieh (in Latin: Eparchia Ioubbensis, Sarbensis et Iuniensis Maronitarum) is an eparchy of the Maronite Church immediately subject to the Maronite Patriarch of Antioch in Lebanon. In 2013 there were 396,250 baptized. It is currently governed by the Maronite Patriarch, Cardinal Bechara Boutros al-Rahi, OMM.

Territory and statistics

The eparchy extends its jurisdiction over the Maronite faithful living in the north-central part of the Mount Lebanon Governorate, in Lebanon. Its eparchial seat is the city of Jounieh.

The territory is divided into 149 parishes and in 2013 there were 396,250 Maronite Catholics.

History

The Eparchy of Sarba was erected on December 11, 1959 with the bull Orientalis Ecclesiae of Pope John XXIII, with territory taken of the Eparchy of Damascus (today archeparchy). The Eparchy of Jounieh was erected on August 4, 1977.

The eparchy of Joubbé was erected on May 2, 1986. On June 9, 1990 the eparchies of Joubbé and Sarba were united, together with Batroun.

On June 5, 1999 the eparchies of Joubbé and Sarba were united to the Eparchy of Jounieh, while Batroun again became an independent ecclesiastical district.

The eparchy is the home of its patriarch of Antioch of the Maronites, which governs the three dioceses by three patriarchal vicars.

Center of Pilgrimage

Harissa, that has a statue of the Our Lady of Lebanon, is a center of pilgrimage for the faithful of the Maronite Church.

Eparchs

Bishops of Sarba

 Michael Doumith (December 11, 1959 – February 25, 1989 deceased)

Bishops of Jounieh

 Chucrallah Harb (August 4, 1977 – June 5, 1999 withdrawn)

Bishops of Joubbé

 Nasrallah Boutros Sfeir (May 2, 1986 – June 9, 1990)

Bishops of Joubbé, Sarba and Batroun

 Nasrallah Boutros Sfeir (June 9, 1990 – June 5, 1999)

Bishops of Joubbé, Sarba and Jounieh

 Nasrallah Boutros Sfeir (June 5, 1999 – February 26, 2011 resigned)
 Bechara Boutros al-Rahi, OMM, (since 15 March 2011)

Auxiliary Bishops of Joubbé, Sarba and Jounieh

 Maroun Ammar, (since June 16, 2012, Titular bishop of Canatha)
 Paul Rouhana, OLM, (since from June 16, 2012, Titular bishop of Antarados)

Sources

 Pontificio Annuario, Libreria Editrice Vaticana, Città del Vaticano, 2003, .

See also

Maronite Church

References

External links
 http://www.catholic-hierarchy.org/diocese/djsjm.html
 http://www.catholic-hierarchy.org/diocese/dj502.html, defunct Eparchy of Jounieh
 http://www.catholic-hierarchy.org/diocese/ds508.html, defunct Eparchy of Sarba
 http://www.gcatholic.org/dioceses/diocese/jebb0.htm
 http://www.niabatsarba.com/, Eparchy of Sarba

Maronite Catholic eparchies
Maronite Church in Lebanon